An ox is an adult male bovine.

Ox or OX may also refer to:

Arts and entertainment

Music
 Ox (band), a Canadian alternative country band
 Ox (musician), a Finnish musician
 Ox (album), by American hardcore band Coalesce
 "The Ox" (instrumental), a 1965 rock instrumental by The Who
 Ox-Fanzine, a German punk zine

Other media
 The Ox (film), a 1991 Swedish film
 Doctor Ox, a fictional doctor and scientist created by Jules Verne in 1872
 Ox (comics), a villain in the Marvel Comics universe
 , a creature from the eponymous book in the Of Man and Manta trilogy by Piers Anthony

Computing
 Ox programming language
 Open-Xchange, a "collaboration software" suite and the company that sponsors it
 the oX framework for OBIX

People
 Ox (nickname), a list of people nicknamed "Ox" or "the Ox"

Places
 Ox Mountains, County Sligo, Ireland
 OX postcode area, covering Oxford, UK
 The Oxford Bar, a pub on Edinburgh's Young Street which features in Ian Rankin's Inspector Rebus novels
 Ox (Belfast restaurant), a restaurant in Belfast, Northern Ireland
 Ox (Portland restaurant), a restaurant in Portland, Oregon, U.S.

Transport
 OX, a version of the Bedford OY British Army lorry, the latter introduced in 1939
 OX, a prototype vehicle developed by Global Vehicle Trust
 Orient Thai Airlines (IATA code OX)

Other uses
 Ox (zodiac), one of the 12 signs of the Chinese zodiac
 Ox (Chinese constellation), one of the 28 mansions of the Chinese constellations
 Oxalate, in chemistry sometimes abbreviated as ox when it forms coordination compounds
 Sendai Television, a Japanese commercial broadcaster